
Ostrowiec County is a unit of territorial administration and local government (powiat) in Świętokrzyskie Voivodeship, south-central Poland. It came into being on January 1, 1999, as a result of the Polish local government reforms passed in 1998.

As of 2019 its total population is 109,512, out of which the population of Ostrowiec Świętokrzyski is 68,641, that of Ćmielów is 3,012, that of Kunów is 2,967, and the rural population is 34,892.

Neighbouring counties
Ostrowiec County is bordered by Lipsko County to the north, Opatów County to the south, and Kielce County and Starachowice County to the west.

Administrative division
The county is subdivided into six gminas (one urban, two urban-rural and three rural). These are listed in the following table, in descending order of population.

References

 
Ostrowiec